The Justice League is a team of comic book superheroes in the . Over the years they have featured many characters in a variety of combinations.

The JLA members are listed here in order of their first joining the team, and none are listed twice. No retconned members are listed (except where they historically took part in the stories). No associates and unofficial members, or members of the Super Friends (except when they are also Justice League members in the mainstream comics) are listed.

Non-full members and staff are also listed below.

Characters in bold are current Justice League active members.

Pre-New 52/Rebirth
DC Comics had the first fictional universe of superheroes, with the Justice Society of America forming in the Golden Age of Comic Books in the 1940s. This shared continuity became increasingly complex with multiple worlds, including a similar team of all-star superheroes formed in the 1960s named the Justice League of America, debuting in The Brave and the Bold Volume 1 #28. This universe included several reboots and retcons starting with Crisis on Infinite Earths in 1986 and culminating in the Flashpoint storyline, leading to the New 52 in 2011.

Members

Other members

Staff

Post-New 52/Rebirth
After the New 52 universe was published for five years, DC merged several of their prior continuities again in the DC Rebirth event. The consequent universe contains elements of all previous DC publications.

Members

Alternate Leagues

In other media

Television

Filmation

Super Friends

DC Animated Universe

The Batman

Smallville

Teen Titans and Teen Titans Go!

Legion of Super-Heroes

The Brave and the Bold

Young Justice

Arrowverse 

In order of appearance:

DC Super Friends

Justice League Action

Titans

Harley Quinn

Film

Justice League of America pilot

DC Universe Animated Original Movies

DC Animated Movie Universe

DC Extended Universe

In order of appearance:

Man of Tomorrow

DC League of Super-Pets

Video games

Justice League Heroes

DC Universe Online

Injustice

DC Legends

LEGO

References

 Members
Justice League